Tegument may refer to:

 Integumentary system, the organ system that protects the body from various kinds of damage, such as loss of water or abrasion from outside the body. 
 Tegument (helminth)
 Viral tegument